25 km Zheleznoy Dorogi Monchegorsk–Olenya is a rural locality (an inhabited locality) in jurisdiction of Monchegorsk Town with Jurisdictional Territory in Murmansk Oblast, Russia, located beyond the Arctic Circle on the Kola Peninsula at a height of  above sea level. Population: 255 (2010 Census).

References

Notes

Sources

Rural localities in Murmansk Oblast
Monchegorsk